Parting Should Be Painless is the fifth studio album by English singer Roger Daltrey, released in February 1984, on the label Atlantic, in the United States, and on WEA in Germany, and Japan. The album was Daltrey's first solo album since the initial break-up of rock band the Who, and the first by any member of the band since the break-up. "Walking in My Sleep", "Parting Would Be Painless", and "Would a Stranger Do" were all released as singles. Two of those singles failed to chart, while "Walking in My Sleep" was a success, peaking at No. 4 on the Mainstream Rock Tracks chart.

On release, the album was received negatively by the majority of music critics. It was also Daltrey's poorest selling studio album up to that point, peaking at No. 102 on the US Billboard chart, however it did make the Top 60 in the Netherlands, peaking at No. 45 on the MegaCharts. The album was produced by Mike Thorne, with the executive producer being listed under the pseudonym "Spike". This is presumably the same woman who was credited as the executive producer of Pete Townshend's compilation album Scoop, later revealed to be Helen Wilkins. The album was re-released as a limited edition audio CD on 12 October 2004, by Wounded Bird Records, but it vanished from the market almost as quickly as it was issued, becoming something of a rarity and by 2014 copies in very good condition were trading for £250.

The album was a concerted effort on Daltrey's part to vent his frustrations in the wake of the Who's break-up by assembling a set of roughly autobiographical songs. These included a track contributed by Roxy Music's Bryan Ferry ("Going Strong"), and a cover version of a song by the Eurythmics ("Somebody Told Me"). The album featured contributions from bass player Norman Watt-Roy, and keyboardist Mick Gallagher who were both members of Ian Dury and the Blockheads. It also features contributions from the critically acclaimed saxophonist Michael Brecker, and from two prolific session musicians, guitarist Chris Spedding, and drummer Allan Schwartzberg (both of whom had worked with Ferry/Roxy Music).

Production and recording
Musically, according to Daltrey the album covered areas that he had wanted The Who to pursue. "Pete [Townshend] and I both said the Who was an alternative to heavy metal, but toward the end, John [Entwistle] got more into that and Pete and I further away from it. Because we were compromising so much, we ended up just settling into what we knew how to do best. It bored me to tears, and I know it bored Pete to tears, too."

Composition
The track Parting Should Be Painless was one of two tracks written by the former Marshall Hain bass player, Kit Hain, whose songs were written for or covered by many artists. Daltrey was again relying on other artists writing contributions to make a cohesive album, and this time, the list included songs written by former Roxy Music lead singer, Bryan Ferry ("Going Strong"), the Eurythmics co-founders Annie Lennox and Dave Stewart ("Somebody Told Me"), and ex-Ian Gillan keyboardist Colin Towns ("How Does the Cold Wind Cry"), as well as successful professional songwriters Nicky Chinn and Simon Climie.

"I'm not a songwriter, but within this album I tried to get songs that — the majority of the songs, anyway — sum up my feelings in the last year," he explained during an appearance on Good Morning America. "Parting Should Be Painless" is a song that refers to the demise of the Who."

Critical reception
The album received negative reviews upon its release, with William Ruhlmann of AllMusic retrospectively writing that the album "contains some interesting tracks, including Bryan Ferry's "Going Strong," which gives you an idea what Roxy Music would sound like if Daltrey was its lead singer", but "for the most part, it consists of mediocre material indifferently sung." Writing for The Wall Street Journal, critic Pam Lambert described the album as "bland". And Wayne King in Record called it disappointing and wondered how much Daltrey had wanted to have a solo career. During an interview in promotion for his 1987 album Can't Wait to See the Movie, Daltrey defended the album explaining, "it's a depressing album. It wasn't what people wanted to hear from me. To appreciate it you have to be depressed. That's the frame of mind I was in."

Cash Box said praised the title track's "self-assuredness and consistently choice musicianship" and Daltrey's "powerful" vocal.

Track listing

Personnel

Credits are adapted from the album's liner notes.
Roger Daltrey – lead and background vocals; harmonica
Chris Spedding – guitars
Mick Gallagher – keyboards
Allan Schwartzberg – drums
Norman Watt-Roy – bass guitar
Michael Brecker – tenor saxophone
Mike Thorne – synthesizers
Robert Medici – marimba
David Tofani – clarinet
Billy Nicholls – backing vocals
James Biondolillo - string and horn arrangements
Production team
Mike Thorne – producer
Harvey Goldberg – engineer
John Brand – engineer
Don Wershba – engineer
Lincoln Clapp – engineer
Graham Hughes - photography

Chart performance

References

External links
 

1984 albums
Roger Daltrey albums
Atlantic Records albums
Albums produced by Mike Thorne